The Castle of Ergnaud (or "Ergnau") is an historic ruin located on a hill close to Plan-Saugey, in the municipality of Bex, Switzerland.

History 
The castle, or fort, dating from the 12th century, was likely meant to communicate with the Castle of Bex (the Duin Tower) and the fort of Seguin.

References

Bex
Castles in Vaud